The Beholder Mile Stakes is a Grade I American Thoroughbred horse race for fillies and mares aged three and up. It is run over a distance of one mile on the dirt each year in March at Santa Anita Park in Arcadia, California.

History
The event was inaugurated in 1940 as the Vanity Handicap at Hollywood Park Racetrack in Inglewood, California over the current distance of one mile.

In 1968 Gamely won carrying a record weight for a winner of 131 pounds in the race. Her owner William Haggin Perry had the three placegetters in the race which carried a record high stakes amount for the fillies and mares of $79,650.

Originally an open handicap for fillies and mares aged three years and up, in 1987 it was changed to an invitational handicap for selected fillies and mares. Over the next three decades, the race switched between open handicap and invitational handicap formats. 
Following the closure of Hollywood Park, the race moved to Santa Anita Park in 2014. In that same year, the event was changed from the handicap format to a weight-for-age race with allowances for horses who had not recently won a graded stakes race.

In 2016 it was announced that the race would be renamed the Vanity Mile and the distance reduced accordingly. In 2017 it was announced that the race would be renamed after the Champion Mare Beholder.

The race is normally run on dirt, except between 2007 and 2013 when Hollywood Park used a synthetic Cushion Track surface.

The race was not run in 1942 and 1943 due to wartime restrictions.

Distance
The race has since been contested at various distances:
1 mile – 1940; 2016–present;
 miles – 1941, 1944–1949, 1951–1953;
 miles – 1950, 1954–1985, 1988–2015;
 miles – 1986–1987.

Records
Time record: 
 1:35.60 for 1 mile – Unique Bella (2018)
 1:46.20 for  miles – Princess Rooney (1984)

Most wins:
 3 – Zenyatta (2008, 2009, 2010)

Winners since 1972

Earlier winners 

1971 : Hi Q.
1970 : Commissary
1969 : Desert Law
1968 : Gamely
1967 : Desert Love
1966 : Khal Ireland
1965 : Jalousie
1964 : Star Maggie
1963 : Table Mate
1962 : Linita
1961 : Perizade
1960 : Silver Spoon
† 1959 : Zevs Joy / Tender Size
1958 : Annie-Lu-San
1957 : Annie-Lu-San
1956 : Mary Machree
1955 : Countess Fleet
1954 : Bubbley
1953 : Fleet Khal
1952 : Two Lea
1951 : Bewitch
1950 : Next Move
1949 : Silver Drift
1948 : Hemet Squaw
1947 : Honeymoon
1946 : Be Faithful
1945 : Busher
1944 : Happy Issue
‡1943 : Race not held
‡1942 : Race not held
1941 : Painted Veil
1940 : Etolia II

Notes:

† Run in two divisions in 1959.

‡ Race not held due to World War II

References

 The Vanity Invitational Handicap at Pedigree Query
 The Vanity Invitational Handicap at the NTRA

Grade 1 stakes races in the United States
Horse races in California
Mile category horse races for fillies and mares
Santa Anita Park
Recurring sporting events established in 1940
1940 establishments in California